Monotherium is an extinct genus of phocid belonging to the subfamily Monachinae. It is known from fossils found in the middle to late Miocene of Belgium.

Species
The type and only species of Monotherium is M. delognii, described from the Tortonian-age Diest Formation of Antwerp, Belgium, on the basis of the lectotype pelvis IRSNB 1153-M257a, b. 

Monotherium affine and M. aberratum were previously assigned to this genus, as well as "Phoca" gaudini, but the former two are now considered a distinct genus, Frisiphoca, while gaudini has been renamed Noriphoca. The middle Miocene phocid "Phoca" wymani Leidy, 1853 was assigned to Monotherium by Ray (1976), but was considered a monachine of uncertain affinities.

References

Miocene pinnipeds
Prehistoric carnivoran genera
Phocines
Burdigalian first appearances
Tortonian extinctions
Prehistoric pinnipeds of North America
Prehistoric pinnipeds of Europe
Fossil taxa described in 1876